Jordan Williams (born October 11, 1990) is an American former professional basketball player. He played two seasons of college basketball for the Maryland Terrapins.

High school career
Williams played high school basketball for Torrington High School in Torrington, Connecticut.  He averaged 36 points a game as a senior in high school.   Due to questions about the level of his competition, Williams did not receive heavy publicity or recruiting attention in high school.

College career
Williams committed to Maryland on October 21, 2008.

Freshman
Williams started 31 games as a freshman for the 2009–10 Maryland Terrapins men's basketball team.  He was an All-ACC rookie team selection.  Williams finished second in rebounding in the ACC.   Maryland coach Gary Williams complimented Williams' growth as a player as the season progressed.

Sophomore
Before his sophomore season, Williams was named  to the preseason watch list for the Wooden Award and Naismith Award watchlists.   In a January 22, 2011 victory over Clemson, Williams recorded his thirteenth straight Double-double, which set a Maryland record.  He broke a streak previously held by Len Elmore. He was picked to the Third Team All-America by Fox Sports.

After the season, Williams submitted his name to the NBA draft.  Initially, he did not sign with an agent, which left open the possibility of staying in college.  He later hired an agent, which precluded a return to collegiate basketball.

Professional career
On June 23, 2011, the New Jersey Nets drafted Williams with the 36th overall pick in the 2011 NBA Draft. During the 2011 NBA lockout, he agreed to play for the Polish team Zastal Zielona Góra. However, the lockout ended before he played a game for them.

Williams was assigned to the Springfield Armor in January 2012. Later that month, Williams was recalled by the Nets.

On July 11, 2012, the Nets traded Williams, Johan Petro, Jordan Farmar, Anthony Morrow, and Deshawn Stevenson to the Atlanta Hawks for Joe Johnson. The Hawks requested waivers on Williams on September 17, 2012.

On August 28, 2013, he signed a one-year deal with Bilbao Basket. However, on September 8, he parted ways with the club.

NBA career statistics

Regular season 

|-
| style="text-align:left;"| 2011-12
| style="text-align:left;"| New Jersey
| 43 || 5 || 14.8 || .507 || .000 || .652 || 3.6 || .3 || .5 || .3 || 4.6
|-
| style="text-align:left;"| Career
| style="text-align:left;"|
| 43 || 5 || 14.8 || .507 || .000 || .652 || 3.6 || .3 || .5 || .3 || 4.6

References

External links
Maryland Terrapins bio
Scout.com profile
Rivals.com profile

1990 births
Living people
American men's basketball players
Basketball players from Connecticut
Centers (basketball)
Maryland Terrapins men's basketball players
New Jersey Nets draft picks
New Jersey Nets players
People from Torrington, Connecticut
Power forwards (basketball)
Springfield Armor players